Greening may refer to:

People
Greening (surname)

Other uses
greening, the act or process of becoming 'green' or environmentally friendly
Greening Australia
Greening Greater Toronto
Greening Earth Society
citrus greening disease, or Huanglongbing, a citrus disease caused by the bacterium, Candidatus  Liberibacter spp.
De-etiolation, or greening, the changes in a plant when it finally obtains light, such as when emerging from the ground or after insufficient light exposure
Greening, Michigan, a former community

See also
Greening's Frog
The Greening of America